The 2014 Texas Southern Lady Tigers softball team represented Texas Southern University in the 2014 NCAA Division I softball season.  Worley Barker entered the year as head coach of the Lady Tigers for a 9th consecutive season. The Lady Tigers were picked to first in the West Division of the pre-season conference polls. The Lady Tigers would do so and go on to win the SWAC's automatic berth in the 2014 NCAA Softball Championships. After going 0-2 in the Lafayette Regional, the Lady Tigers finished the season 31-20.

2014 Roster

Schedule 

|-
!colspan=10 style="background:#808080; color:#800000;"| Southeastern Louisiana Tournament

 
|-
!colspan=10 style="background:#808080; color:#800000;"| Regular Season

|-
!colspan=10 style="background:#808080; color:#800000;"| Texas Invitational

|-
!colspan=10 style="background:#808080; color:#800000;"| Regular Season

|-
!colspan=10 style="background:#808080; color:#800000;"| SWAC Round-Up

|-
!colspan=10 style="background:#808080; color:#800000;"| Regular Season

|-
!colspan=10 style="background:#808080; color:#800000;"| 2014 SWAC Tournament

|-
!colspan=10 style="background:#808080;"| 2014 NCAA Regionals

Television
All 5 games during the Texas Invitational aired on Longhorn Network. The SWAC Tournament semifinal game aired on ESPNU. The Lafayette Regionals aired on ESPN3.

Television Broadcast Assignments:
Louisiana-Monroe: Tyler Denning & Megan Willis
Southern Miss: Tyler Denning & Megan Willis 
Southern Miss: Tyler Denning & Megan Willis 
Texas: Alex Loeb & Amanda Scarborough 
Texas: Alex Loeb & Amanda Scarborough 
Prairie View A&M (May 9): Melissa Lee & Kayla Braud
Louisiana-Lafayette: Melissa Lee & Kayla Braud
Mississippi State: Melissa Lee & Kayla Braud

References 

Texas
Texas Southern Lady Tigers softball seasons
Texas Southern Lady Tigers softball